Kim Woo-jin (born April 8, 1997), also known mononymously as Woojin, is a South Korean singer and actor. He was signed to JYP Entertainment and was a member of the boy group Stray Kids from their formation through the eponymous survival show in 2017 until his departure two years later. He signed with 10x Entertainment in his endeavor to launch a solo career. Amidst his transition to a soloist, he faced false accusations of sexual misconduct by anonymous users on social media website Twitter. He denied the allegations and an investigation found various forms of fabrication from the accusers. He released his debut mini-album The Moment : A Minor and its lead single "Ready Now" in August 2021.

Life and career
Kim Woo-jin was born on April 8, 1997, in Bucheon, Gyeonggi Province, South Korea. He graduated from the School of Performing Arts Seoul. He was a trainee under SM Entertainment for one year, where he practiced with fellow apprentices that would go on to debut as part of NCT. On October 11, 2017, Kim was unveiled as a JYP Entertainment trainee. He competed in Mnet's reality survival show Stray Kids to become a member of the record label's forthcoming boy group Stray Kids as a vocalist. In midst of the competition, the group made the single "Hellevator" available via digital music stores on November 1. The nine-member lineup was confirmed in the final episode of the reality show and Stray Kids released their pre-debut mini-album Mixtape fronted by "Beware" on January 8, 2018. Their official debut mini-album I Am Not and its lead single "District 9" were released on March 26, 2018. On October 28, 2019, JYP Entertainment announced Kim's departure from Stray Kids and termination of his exclusive contract, citing personal circumstances.

Kim posted to a newly created Instagram account in January 2020 with the phrase "Kim Woo-jin restart". He held a fan meeting in May and signed with the newly formed 10x Entertainment in August as the first artist on the label's roster. Ahead of his solo record, Kim issued the pre-debut digital single "Still Dream" on July 8, 2021. His debut mini-album The Moment : A Minor and its lead single "Ready Now" were released on August 8. In November, he provided the song "Because It's You" to the soundtrack of the television drama Let Me Be Your Knight. He was cast in the web film 3.5th Period as the "sweet, handsome guy" Lee Han-ik and contributed the track "Timeless" for its soundtrack in December.

Kim will embark on his 1st World Tour 2022 "Still Dream", starting with shows in Europe from July to August. Additional concerts in Asia, North America, and South America are planned. He will play the lead role in HBO Max's upcoming romantic fantasy series Beyond the Closet, becoming the first South Korean actor to be cast in the company's global project. It is scheduled to air in 2023.

False allegations
In September 2020, Kim was accused of sexual harassment by unidentified women on the social media platform Twitter. One accuser alleged that, in spite of refusing his approach, Kim had attempted to touch her and her friend. In another instance, a user asserted to have met Kim at a bar on April 29. She claimed that, after rejecting his verbal and physical advances, he cursed at her. The user uploaded a photo of alcohol bottles between her and a man's torso opposite her who she identified as Kim. She pointed to an Instagram photo from his account in which he wore a matching gray sweatshirt that he had posted on the day the incident allegedly took place. Kim denied the allegations, stating that he "never even met that person" and had "never been to the places that they've mentioned". He filed a suit with the Seoul Metropolitan Police Agency against the individuals for defamation.

The investigation determined that the liquor in the photo was Glenburgie whisky, which was available in South Korea from the end of 2019 and helped narrow their search due to its limited availability at the time. In a search through Instagram hashtags under the whisky name, they were able to identify the original photo post. It was established that the image was taken from an account that had no association with Kim. Upon obtaining CCTV footage from the bar from that night, it was concluded that the photo, which was taken on August 31, 2020, originated from one of two men at the table, neither of which was Kim. The probe also found that one of the accusers who was an anti-fan spreading disinformation and the person who disseminated the allegations were both Brazilian nationals. In July 2021, 10x Entertainment published a documentary entitled Finger Killer, which examines the false accusations of sexual harassment made against Kim.

Discography

Albums

Extended plays

Singles

Soundtrack appearances

Filmography

Television

Film

Concerts and tours
 Kim Woo Jin 1st World Tour <Still Dream> (2022)

References

External links
 

1997 births
21st-century South Korean male actors
21st-century South Korean singers
JYP Entertainment artists
K-pop singers
Living people
People from Bucheon
School of Performing Arts Seoul alumni
South Korean male film actors
South Korean male idols
South Korean pop singers
Stray Kids members